Mang Thít is a rural district of Vĩnh Long province, in the Mekong Delta region of Vietnam. As of 2003, the district had a population of 101,942. The district covers an area of 158 km². The district capital lies at Cái Nhum.

References

Districts of Vĩnh Long province